

Hans von Tettau (30 November 1888  – 30 January 1956) was a German general (General of the Infantry) in the Wehrmacht during World War II who held commands at the divisional and corps level.  He was a recipient of the  Knight's Cross of the Iron Cross with Oak Leaves of Nazi Germany. Tettau surrendered to the Allied forces in May 1945; he was released in 1947.  He wrote a book with General Kurt Versock called The History of the 24th Infantry Division.

Although much decorated, Tettau's reputation is debatable. Some German historians argue that he had little real military experience up to his countermeasures at the Battle of Arnhem in 1944, the Allied Operation Market Garden. Fellow generals spoke of Tettau, whose regular work in the army was more that of an inspector than of a commanding officer, in a negative way when he organised his defences in the Netherlands under the name of Westgruppe, which was not a formal army division.  Instead, this was seen as a political move by Tettau to gain credit in Berlin.

Awards and decorations
 Iron Cross (1914) 2nd Class (18 September 1914) & 1st Class (18 September 1915)

 Clasp to the Iron Cross (1939) 2nd Class (22 September 1939) & 1st Class (5 October 1939)
 German Cross in Gold on 5 May 1942 as Generalleutnant and commander of 24. Infanterie-Division
 Knight's Cross of the Iron Cross with Oak Leaves
 Knight's Cross on 3 September 1942 as Generalleutnant and commander of 24. Infanterie-Division
 821st Oak Leaves on 5 April 1945 as Generalleutnant and commander of Korpsgruppe von Tettau

References

Citations

Bibliography

 
 
 
 
 Verhoef, CEHJ (2012)De slag om de Ginkelse heide bij Ede / druk Heruitgave 17 en 18 September 1944. 

1888 births
1956 deaths
German Army generals of World War II
Generals of Infantry (Wehrmacht)
German Army personnel of World War I
Recipients of the clasp to the Iron Cross, 1st class
Recipients of the Gold German Cross
Recipients of the Knight's Cross of the Iron Cross with Oak Leaves
German prisoners of war in World War II
People from Bautzen
People from the Kingdom of Saxony
Reichswehr personnel
Military personnel from Saxony